Fescoggia is a village and former municipality in the canton of Ticino, Switzerland.

In 2005 the municipality was merged with the other, neighboring municipalities Arosio, Breno, Mugena and Vezio to form a new and larger municipality Alto Malcantone.

References

 

Former municipalities of Ticino
Villages in Ticino